Acanthaclisinae is a subfamily of Myrmeleontidae, the antlions. It comprises a single tribe, Acanthaclisini, which has about 221 species in 16 genera.

References

External links 

Myrmeleontidae
Insect subfamilies